San Cebrián de Mazote is a municipality located in the province of Valladolid, Castile and León, Spain.

According to the 2004 census (INE), the municipality had a population of 200 inhabitants.

The village has a medieval church dedicated to a saint known as Cipriano or Cebrián (Cyprian in English). The architecture has been described as Mozarabic or Repoblación.

References

Municipalities in the Province of Valladolid